Suhana Thapa is a Nepali film actress. She debuted as an actor with the film A Mero Hajur 3, of her own home production.

Personal life 
Thapa is a devotee of the Hindu god Krishna.

Career

Film production 
She has also produced A Mero Hajur (2002), A Mero Hajur 2 (2017), A Mero Hajur 3 (2019) and A Mero Hajur 4 ( 2022).

Acting career

Thapa appeared as child artist in A Mero Hajur (2002), she recalls "Yes, A Mero Hajur was my first movie, but I hardly remember it since I was very young.". In the prequel of A Mero Hajur (2002) she appeared as a lead actress in A Mero Hajur 3 (2019) opposite of Anmol K.C.

Filmography

Awards

References

External links

 

1996 births
21st-century Nepalese actresses
Actors from Kathmandu
Living people
Nepalese film actresses
Actresses in Nepali cinema
Nepalese film producers
Nepalese Hindus
Nepalese women film producers